Tibor Lewis Szabo (born 28 October 1959) is an English former footballer who played in the Football League as a forward for Bradford City.

Born in Bradford to Hungarian parents, Szabo also played in non-league football for clubs including Macclesfield Town, Mossley, Gainsborough Trinity, Goole Town, Morecambe, Buxton, Accrington Stanley, Atherton Laburnum Rovers, Harrogate Railway Athletic, Ossett Albion, Ossett Town, Liversedge, Eccleshill United and East Bowling Unity. He taught PE, and after his playing career ended, he coached juniors in both England and the United States.

References

1959 births
Living people
Footballers from Bradford
English footballers
Association football forwards
Bradford City A.F.C. players
Macclesfield Town F.C. players
Mossley A.F.C. players
Gainsborough Trinity F.C. players
Goole Town F.C. players
Morecambe F.C. players
Buxton F.C. players
Accrington Stanley F.C. players
Atherton Laburnum Rovers F.C. players
Harrogate Railway Athletic F.C. players
Ossett Albion A.F.C. players
Ossett Town F.C. players
Liversedge F.C. players
Eccleshill United F.C. players
English Football League players
Northern Premier League players
English people of Hungarian descent